Asadoya Yunta (Yaeyama: 安里屋ユンタ, Asadoya Yunta) is a Ryukyuan folk song originating from the Yaeyama Islands of Okinawa Prefecture, Japan.

History

Origins 
The lyrics to Asadoya Yunta originated from a story where a beautiful lady from Taketomi Island, known as Asato Kuyama (安里クヤマ) (1722-1799), received a wedding proposal from a Ryukyuan government official who came from another island. In one version of the story, the woman bravely rejects the proposal as she felt as if marrying a local man from her island would provide a better life than to become a mistress of this official. In another version, Kuyama ends up marrying him. The first version is popular in the Okinawa Islands whereas the latter version is popular in Taketomi.

There is an anti-government motive behind this song, as it took place when the Japanese owned the Ryukyu Kingdom as one of its vassal states, heavily taxing the local populace.

Popularity 
While initially popular in the Ryukyu Islands, it soon spread to mainland Japan in 1934, when Nippon Columbia created a Japanese language version of it. The Japanese lyrics were more of a love song rather than a retelling of Asadoya nu Kuyama's story.

Lyrics 
These are the original lyrics in the Yaeyama language (Taketomi dialect):

In popular culture 
Numerous artists have performed covers of Asadoya Yunta, such as Haruomi Hosono, Ryuichi Sakamoto, Rimi Natsukawa and Blondie.

References 

Ryukyu Islands
Okinawa Prefecture
Ryukyuan folk songs